Paul Meurisse (21 December 1912 – 19 January 1979) was a French actor who appeared in over 60 films and many stage productions.  Meurisse was noted for the elegance of his acting style, and for his versatility.  He was equally able to play comedic and serious dramatic roles.  His screen roles ranged from the droll and drily humorous to the menacing and disturbing.  His most celebrated role was that of the sadistic and vindictive headmaster in the 1955 film Les Diaboliques.

Early life and career 

Meurisse was born in Dunkirk, on the north-east coast of France. He grew up on the island of Corsica, to where his bank manager father had been transferred when Meurisse was a small child.

After leaving school, Meurisse moved to Aix-en-Provence, where he became a solicitor's clerk.  But his passion was for the stage, and he acquired evening work in the chorus of music hall revues.

In 1936, Meurisse moved to Paris, where he found work in musical theatres and nightclubs, and appeared with performers such as Marie Dubas. He specialised in taking cheerful, upbeat songs and singing them in a comically downbeat, lugubrious fashion.

In 1939, Meurisse met singer Edith Piaf, and the two became lovers for two years.  Piaf, however, did not see a future for Meurisse as a singer, and encouraged him to try acting instead.

Film career 
Meurisse first performed in film in Vingt-quatre heures de perm, which was filmed in 1940 but not released until 1945. Ne bougez plus (1941) was the first of his films to be released.  Thereafter he was in steady demand as an actor (in 1948, for example, he was credited in seven films).  Meurisse played a wide range of roles, from gangsters (Macadam, Impasse des Deux-Anges) and policemen (Inspecteur Sergil, Le Dessous des cartes), to comedy (the Monocle films) and historical (La Castiglione, L'Affaire des poisons).  The quality of the films was varied, but Meurisse's versatility brought him recognition, with his performance often considered the best part of an otherwise mediocre effort.

Meurisse's most famous role was that of Michel Delasalle in Henri-Georges Clouzot's 1955 thriller Les Diaboliques, with Simone Signoret and Véra Clouzot.  In a thoroughly unsympathetic part, Meurisse was compelling. The film, with its dark, claustrophobic atmosphere and celebrated twist ending, became an international success.  It was among the earliest foreign-language films to be widely distributed in English-speaking markets and is the film for which Meurisse is best known.

Other of his notable films include Julien Duvivier's inquisitorial and oppressive Marie-Octobre (1959), Jean Renoir's Le Dejeuner sur l'herbe (1959), Clouzot's courtroom drama La Vérité (1960) and Melville's crime thriller Le deuxième souffle (1966).  Meurisse made three appearances as Commandant Théobald Dromard, aka "The Monocle", in the Eurospy comedies Le monocle noir (1961), L'oeil du monocle (1962), and Le monocle rit jaune (1964).

The 1969 film L'Armée des ombres, in which Meurisse had a leading role, was released in 2006 on DVD, under the title Army of Shadows, in the UK and US, to critical acclaim.

Stage career 

Meurisse appeared in many stage productions, in plays by both contemporary French authors such as Marcel Achard and Jean Anouilh to classical English playwrights Shakespeare and George Bernard Shaw.  In the mid-1950s he was a sociétaire of the Comédie-Française.

Private life 

Meurisse married three times: to Michèle Alfa (1942, divorced); Micheline Cheirel (1951, divorced; she was previously married to British actor John Loder); and Micheline Gary (1960 to his death).

Death 

Meurisse suffered from asthma for much of his life. He was taken ill following a performance at the Théâtre Hébertot in Paris. He died at age 66 on 19 January 1979 of an asthma-related heart attack.

Filmography 

 1941: Ne bougez plus (dir. Pierre Caron) – Hector
 1941: Montmartre-sur-Seine (dir. Georges Lacombe) – Paul Mariol
 1942: Défense d'aimer (dir. Richard Pottier) – Maxime Gavard
 1942: Mariage d'amour  (dir. Henri Decoin) – Robert
 1943: La Ferme aux loups (dir. Richard Pottier) – Furet
 1945: Vingt-quatre heures de perm (dir. Maurice Cloche)
 1945: Marie la Misère (dir. Jacques de Baroncelli) – Edouard
 1946: L'Insaisissable Frédéric (dir. Richard Pottier) – B.B. / Richard Fernay
 1946: Macadam (dir. Marcel Blistène) – Victor Menard
 1947: Inspecteur Sergil (dir. Jacques Daroy) – Inspecteur Pierre Sergil
 1947: Monsieur Chasse (dir. Willy Rozier) – Moricet
 1947: Bethsabée (dir. Léonide Moguy) – Le capitaine Lucien Sommervill – l'ex amant d'Arabella
 1947: La Fleur de l'âge (dir. Marcel Carné) (uncompleted) 
 1948: La Dame d'onze heures (dir. Jean-Devaivre) – Stanislas-Octave Seminario dit 'SOS'
 1948: Manù il contrabbandiere (dir. Lucio De Caro) – Ispettore Nansen
 1948: Le Colonel Durand (dir. René Chanas) – Le colonel d'empire Gérard Durand
 1948: Le Dessous des cartes (dir. André Cayatte) – Inspecteur Nansen
 1948: Dilemma of Two Angels (dir. Maurice Tourneur) – Jean
 1948: Sergil et le dictateur (dir. Jacques Daroy) – Inspecteur Sergil
 1948: Scandale (dir. René Le Hénaff) – Steve Richardson
 1949: The Red Angel (dir. Jacques Daniel-Norman) – Pierre Ravignac
 1949: Dernière heure, édition spéciale (dir. Maurice de Canonge) – Dominique Coche
 1950: Agnès de rien (dir. Pierre Billon) – Carlos de Chaligny
 1951: Maria of the End of the World (dir. Jean Stelli) – Mathias
 1951:  (dir. Jean Stelli) – William A. Schomberg
 1951: Ma femme est formidable (dir. André Hunebelle) – Lui-même (uncredited)
 1951: Vedettes sans maquillage (dir. Jacques Guillon) (documentary)
 1952: Sergil chez les filles (dir. Jacques Daroy) – Inspecteur Sergil
 1953: Je suis un mouchard (dir. René Chanas) – Bob Torquella
 1954: La contessa di Castiglione  dir. Georges Combret) – L'empereur Napoléon III
 1955: Les Diaboliques (dir.  Henri-Georges Clouzot) – Michel Delassalle
 1955:  (dir. Bernard Borderie) – Mordhom
 1955: The Affair of the Poisons (dir. Henri Decoin) – L'abbé Etienne Guibourg
 1957: Jusqu'au dernier (dir. Pierre Billon) – Fredo Ricioni – le chef de la bande
 1957: L'Inspecteur aime la bagarre (dir. Jean-Devaivre) – L'inspecteur Morice
 1957: Les Violents (dir. Henri Calef) – Inspecteur Principal Malouvier
 1958: Échec au porteur (dir. Gilles Grangier) – Le commissaire divisionnaire Varzeilles
 1958: Le Septième Ciel (dir. Raymond Bernard) – Manuel Villa
 1959: Marie-Octobre (dir. Julien Duvivier) – François Renaud-Picart, industriel
 1959: Guinguette (dir. Jean Delannoy) – Le vicomte Edouard de Villancourt
 1959: La Tête contre les murs (dir.  Georges Franju) – Dr. Emery
 1959: Le Déjeuner sur l'herbe (dir. Jean Renoir) – Etienne Alexis
 1959: Simenon (dir. Jean-François Hauduroy) (documentary – narrator) 
 1960: La Française et l'Amour (dir. Henri Verneuil) – Jean-Claude Perret (segment "Adultère, L'")
 1960: La Vérité (dir. Henri-Georges Clouzot) – Maître Éparvier
 1961: Le Monocle noir (dir. Georges Lautner) – Le commandant Théobald Dromard dit 'Le Monocle'
 1961: Le Jeu de la vérité (dir. Robert Hossein) – Portrant
 1961: Les Nouveaux aristocrates (dir. Francis Rigaud) – Le père Philippe de Maubrun
 1962: Carillons sans joie (dir. Charles Brabant) – Le capitaine de Lambérieux
 1962: L'Œil du Monocle (dir. Georges Lautner) – Le commandant Théobald Dromard, dit "Le Monocle"
 1962: Du mouron pour les petits oiseaux (dir. Marcel Carné) – Armand Lodet
 1963: Méfiez-vous, mesdames (dir. André Hunebelle) – Charles Rouvier
 1963: Les Tontons flingueurs (dir. Georges Lautner) – Un passant distingué (uncredited)
 1963: L'assassin connaît la musique... (dir. Pierre Chenal) – Lionel Fribourg
 1964: Le Monocle rit jaune (dir. Georges Lautner) – Le commandant Théobald Dromard dit'Le Monocle'
 1965: Moi et les hommes de quarante ans (dir. Jacques Pinoteau) – Alexandre Dumourier
 1965: Le Majordome (dir. Jean Delannoy) – Léopold
 1965: La Grosse Caisse (dir. Alex Joffé) – Paul Filippi, le gangster
 1965: Quand passent les faisans (dir. Édouard Molinaro) – Alexandre Larsan-Bellac
 1966:  (dir. Géza von Radványi) – Count Talleyrand
 1966: Le deuxième souffle (dir. Jean-Pierre Melville) – Commissaire Blot
 1969: L'Armée des ombres (dir. Jean-Pierre Melville) – Luc Jardie
 1971: Le Cri du cormoran le soir au-dessus des jonques (dir. Michel Audiard) – Kruger
 1971: Doucement les basses (dir. Jacques Deray) – L'évêque
 1973: Un flic hors la loi (dir. Stefano Vanzina)
 1973: Les Voraces (dir. Sergio Gobbi) – L'inspecteur Martino
 1974: The Suspects (dir. Michel Wyn) – Laurent Kirchner
 1975: Le Gitan (dir. José Giovanni) – Yan Kuq
 1975: L'Éducation amoureuse de Valentin (dir. Jean L'Hôte) – Julien Blaise (final film role)

References

External links 
 Alexey Gusev. "The Man Who Wasn't Here.", Seance blog (in Russian). Article for the 100th anniversary of Paul Meurisse's birth.
 
 

1912 births
1979 deaths
People from Dunkirk
French male film actors
French male stage actors
Sociétaires of the Comédie-Française
20th-century French male actors